The 2015 New Orleans Bowl was a postseason American college football bowl game played on December 19, 2015 at the Mercedes-Benz Superdome in New Orleans, Louisiana.  The 15th edition of the New Orleans Bowl featured the Louisiana Tech Bulldogs from Conference USA against the Arkansas State Red Wolves of the Sun Belt Conference. It began at 8:00 p.m. CST and air on ESPN.  It was one of the 2015–16 bowl games that concludes the 2015 FBS football season.  Sponsored by freight shipping company R+L Carriers, it was officially known as the R+L Carriers New Orleans Bowl.

Teams
The game featured the Louisiana Tech Bulldogs against the Arkansas State Red Wolves.  It was the 38th overall meeting between the schools, with Louisiana Tech leading the series 25–12 before this game (both had previously been in-conference foes in the Southland Conference and Big West Conference before Louisiana Tech joined the Western Athletic Conference and later Conference USA and Arkansas State joined the Sun Belt).  The last meeting between these two teams was in 1998, when the Bulldogs beat the Indians 69–21 in Jonesboro.

Arkansas State Red Wolves

Sources told ESPN reporter Brett McMurphy that the Red Wolves had officially been invited to the game and accepted.

This was the Red Wolves' second trip to the New Orleans Bowl; they (at the time known as the Indians) had previously played in the 2005 game, losing to the Southern Miss Golden Eagles by a score of 31–19.  Notably, that game was played at Cajun Field in nearby Lafayette because of damage to the Superdome done by Hurricane Katrina.

Louisiana Tech Bulldogs

This was the Bulldogs' second straight bowl appearance under third-year head coach Skip Holtz, following a 35–18 victory over Illinois in the 2014 Heart of Dallas Bowl. Holtz had a 3–3 career record in bowl games as head coach at Louisiana Tech, South Florida and East Carolina. The Louisiana Tech program entered 3–3–1 all-time in FBS bowl games.

Game summary

Scoring summary

Source:

Statistics

References

New Orleans Bowl
New Orleans Bowl
Arkansas State Red Wolves football bowl games
Louisiana Tech Bulldogs football bowl games
New Orleans Bowl
December 2015 sports events in the United States